Andrei Kovacs (born 23 November 1921) was a Romanian alpine skier. He competed in the men's slalom at the 1952 Winter Olympics.

References

External links
 

1921 births
Possibly living people
Romanian male alpine skiers
Olympic alpine skiers of Romania
Alpine skiers at the 1952 Winter Olympics
Sportspeople from Baia Mare